In card games, a meld is a set of matching cards, typically three or more, that earn a player points and/or allow them to deplete their hand.  Melds typically come in sequences of ascending cards belonging to the same suit known as runs or sets/groups of cards of identical rank. Other ones may be marriage (e.g. K and Q) and bezique (Q and J).

Melding is typical in games of the rummy family, such as canasta and gin.

It is also used in other games such as mahjong. Melds are also made in some trick-taking games, such as pinochle and bezique.

See also 
 Run (cards)
 Set (cards)

References

Bibliography 

 Parlett, David. The Penguin Book of Card Games. London: Penguin (2008). .

Card game terminology